Viktor Anatoliyovych Skrypnyk (born 19 November 1969) is a Ukrainian former professional footballer and current manager of Vorskla Poltava. As a player, he helped Werder Bremen to the league and cup double in 2004.

Skrypnyk became the first Ukrainian head coach in Bundesliga.

Playing career
Before playing professionally, in 1987–88 Skrypnyk participated in the reserve competitions of the Soviet Top League for Dnipro Dnipropetrovsk playing some 46 games. In 1987 Skrypnyk also played one game for Dnipro in the Soviet Cup.

In 1989 Skrypnyk signed with the prime Zaporizhzhia club Metalurh that played at the Soviet First League (tier 2) and for which he started his professional career. His debut in the Soviet Top League (Vysshaya Liga), Skrypnyk made for FC Metalurh Zaporizhya (Metallurg) in 1991 along with the club's debut at the top level. He continued to play for the Zaporizhzhia team after dissolution of the Soviet Union when the Metalurh Zaporizhya was admitted to the Vyshcha Liha (Ukrainian Top League) in 1992–1994. In the mid 1990s Skrypnyk returned to his "home" club in Dnipro for couple of seasons. In 1995–1996 he played for FC Dnipro when it was coached by Bernd Stange who later recommended Skrypnyk to Werder that was coached by Hans-Jürgen Dörner. Around that time he was also called up to the Ukraine national football team for which Skrypnyk debuted in 1994. In 1996 he was sold for 1.5 million DM to the German side Werder Bremen with which he stayed for about 22 years (1996–2018). In 1999–2000 Skrypnyk was injured several times and even hospitalized, because of that he did not play neither for the club or the national team. At the end of 2002–03 season Skrypnyk again sustained a major injury and recovered only by the winter intermission of the 2003–04. After the 2003–04 season aged at 34, he decided to retire.

Coaching career
After retiring from playing career Skrypnyk stayed with Werder as a coach at the Werder's football academy. His coaching UEFA license "A" Skrypnyk received initially in Kyiv and supposedly it had to be good across whole Europe. But in Germany no one was acknowledging the license and he had to take the coaching courses again in Germany. At first it was the category "B" license which allowed Skrypnyk to train children. With time he received the top category license.

Skrypnyk became head coach of Werder Bremen II from 18 June 2013 until 25 October 2014 when he took over the first team of Werder Bremen. He finished with a record of 31 wins, seven draws, and nine losses for the reserve team. He made his debut against Chemnitzer FC in the DFB-Pokal on 28 October 2014. He was sacked on 18 September 2016 along with assistant coach Torsten Frings.

On 5 July 2018, he was appointed as the new manager of Latvian Higher League club Riga FC. On 5 February 2019 it was announced, that Skripnik had left the club.

On 10 June 2022 he was appointed as new manager of Vorskla Poltava.

Career statistics

Club

International

International goals
Scores and results list Ukraine's goal tally first.

Managerial statistics

Honours

As player
Werder Bremen
 Bundesliga: 2003–04
 DFB-Pokal: 1998–99, 2003–04

As manager
Riga FC
 Latvian Higher League: 2018
 Latvian Football Cup: 2018

Zorya Luhansk
 Ukrainian Cup: Runner-Up 2020-21

Individual
 Best Coach of Ukrainian Premier League: 2019–20

References

External links

 

Living people
1969 births
People from Novomoskovsk
Association football defenders
Soviet footballers
Ukrainian footballers
Ukraine international footballers
Ukrainian expatriate footballers
FC Dnipro players
FC Metalurh Zaporizhzhia players
SV Werder Bremen players
SV Werder Bremen managers
Soviet Top League players
Ukrainian Premier League players
Bundesliga players
Expatriate footballers in Germany
Expatriate football managers in Germany
Ukrainian football managers
Ukrainian expatriate football managers
Ukrainian expatriate sportspeople in Germany
Bundesliga managers
SV Werder Bremen II managers
Ukrainian expatriate sportspeople in Latvia
Expatriate football managers in Latvia
Riga FC managers
FC Zorya Luhansk managers
FC Vorskla Poltava managers
Ukrainian Premier League managers
Sportspeople from Dnipropetrovsk Oblast